Four Bears Village is a census-designated place (CDP) in McKenzie County, North Dakota, United States. The population was 500 at the 2020 census.

Geography
Four Bears Village is located at  (47.982231, -102.578859).

Demographics

As of the census of 2000, there were 364 people, 87 households, and 80 families residing in the CDP.  The population density was 348.8 people per square mile (135.1/km2).  There were 90 housing units at an average density of 86.2/sq mi (33.4/km2).  The racial makeup of the CDP was 4.12% White, 93.96% Native American, and 1.92% from two or more races. Hispanic or Latino of any race were 3.02% of the population.

There were 87 households, out of which 65.5% had children under the age of 18 living with them, 42.5% were married couples living together, 36.8% had a female householder with no husband present, and 8.0% were non-families. 6.9% of all households were made up of individuals, and 1.1% had someone living alone who was 65 years of age or older.  The average household size was 4.18 and the average family size was 4.19.

In the CDP, the population was spread out, with 48.6% under the age of 18, 7.7% from 18 to 24, 29.1% from 25 to 44, 11.5% from 45 to 64, and 3.0% who were 65 years of age or older.  The median age was 19 years. For every 100 females, there were 83.8 males.  For every 100 females age 18 and over, there were 76.4 males.

The median income for a household in the CDP was $28,194, and the median income for a family was $26,250. Males had a median income of $29,125 versus $17,500 for females. The per capita income for the CDP was $7,681.  About 35.7% of families and 31.2% of the population were below the poverty line, including 38.0% of those under age 18 and 50.0% of those age 65 or over.

Education
It is within New Town Public Schools.

References

Census-designated places in McKenzie County, North Dakota
Census-designated places in North Dakota
Mandan, Hidatsa, and Arikara Nation